Thomaz Bellucci was the defending champion but decided not to participate.
Florian Mayer beat Jiří Veselý 4–6, 6–2, 6–1, to win the title.

Seeds

Draw

Finals

Top half

Bottom half

References
 Main Draw
 Qualifying Draw

Sparkassen Open - Singles
2013 Singles